When Stars Are Scattered is a nonfiction young adult graphic novel written by  Victoria Jamieson and Omar Mohamed, illustrated by Victoria Jamieson and Iman Geddy, and published April 14, 2020, by Dial Books.

Alongside other honors, the book won the Walter Dean Myers Award for Young Readers and Bank Street Children's Book Committee's Josette Frank Award.

Plot 
When Stars Are Scattered follows co-author Mohamed and his younger brother, Hassan, who were born in Somalia and fled to a refugee camp in Kenya when they were toddlers. Although an older woman adopted the brothers, they never stopped searching for their mother. While at the camp, Mohamed was often forced to choose between his own education and caring Hassan, who was nonverbal and had seizures. Eventually, they were able to move to the United States.

Reception

Reviews 
When Stars Are Scattered was generally well-received, including starred reviews from Booklist, The Horn Book, Kirkus Reviews, Publishers Weekly, and School Library Journal.

Writing for School Library Journal, Steven Engelfried said, "The writing is intriguing and easy to understand. The graphics are beautiful and really bring the characters to the page. Omar’s story is important, relevant, and relatable."

Kirkus Reviews wrote, "This engaging, heartwarming story does everything one can ask of a book, and then some."

The audiobook, which has 12 narrators, received a starred review from Booklist, who said, the audiobook "offers listeners an experience of perfection in its storytelling, format shifting, and performance."

When Stars Are Scattered was named one of the best books of 2020 by the Chicago Public Library, Kirkus Reviews, the New York Public Library, The New York Times, NPR, Publishers Weekly, and School Library Journal.

Awards and honors 
Both the book and audiobook editions of When Stars Are Scattered are Junior Library Guild selections.

References 

Dial Press books
2020 graphic novels
2020 non-fiction books
Novels set in Kenya